The PrimePages is a website about prime numbers originally created by Chris Caldwell at the University of Tennessee at Martin who maintained it from 1994 to 2023.

The site maintains the list of the "5,000 largest known primes", selected smaller primes of special forms, and many "top twenty" lists for primes of various forms. , the 5,000th prime has around 544,000 digits.

The PrimePages has articles on primes and primality testing. It includes "The Prime Glossary" with articles on hundreds of glosses related to primes, and "Prime Curios!" with thousands of curios about specific numbers.

The database started as a list of "titanic primes" (primes with at least 1000 decimal digits) by Samuel Yates in 1984.

See also 
List of prime numbers

References

External links
 
 The Prime Glossary
 Prime Curios!
 Prime Curios! book

Prime numbers
Mathematics websites
University of Tennessee at Martin
American educational websites
Databases in the United States
Mathematical databases